Bendemann is a German surname. Notable people with the surname include:

Eduard Bendemann (1811–1889), German painter
Felix von Bendemann (1848–1915), German Imperial Navy admiral
Rudolf Bendemann (1851–1884), German painter

German-language surnames

de:Bendemann